The 2006 Michigan Senate elections took place on November 7, 2006, with partisan primaries to select the parties' candidates in the various districts on August 6, 2006.

Results

Districts 1-19

Districts 20-38

See also
Michigan House of Representatives election, 2006

References

2006 Michigan elections
Michigan Senate elections
Michigan Senate
November 2006 events in the United States